Finn Lemke (born 30 April 1992) is a German handball player for MT Melsungen and the German national team.

Achievements
Summer Olympics:
: 2016
European Championship:
: 2016
DHB-Pokal:
: 2016

Personal life
His younger brother Jari plays handball in Handball-Bundesliga, too.

References

External links

 
 
 

1992 births
Living people
German male handball players
Sportspeople from Bremen
Handball-Bundesliga players
Olympic handball players of Germany
Handball players at the 2016 Summer Olympics
Medalists at the 2016 Summer Olympics
Olympic bronze medalists for Germany
Olympic medalists in handball
MT Melsungen players
Handball players at the 2020 Summer Olympics